The men's 800 metres competition of the athletics event at the 2015 Southeast Asian Games was held on 10 June at the National Stadium in Singapore.

Records
Prior to this competition, the existing Asian and Games records were as follows:

Schedule

Results

Final

References

See also

Men's 800 metres